The Lauderdale County School District is a public school district based in Lauderdale County, Mississippi (USA).

Schools
Northeast High School (Grades 9-12)
Southeast High School (Grades 9-12)
Northeast Middle School (Grades 5–8)
Southeast Middle School (Grades 5–8)
Northeast Elementary School (Grades PK-4)
Southeast Elementary School (Grades PK-4)
West Lauderdale Elementary School (Grades K-4)
Clarkdale Attendance Center (Grades K-12)
West Lauderdale Attendance Center
West Lauderdale High School (Grades 9-12)
West Lauderdale Middle School (Grades 5–8)

Demographics

2006-07 school year
There were a total of 6,528 students enrolled in the Lauderdale County School District during the 2006–2007 school year. The gender makeup of the district was 47% female and 53% male. The racial makeup of the district was 67.97% Caucasian, 30.36% African American, 1.12% Hispanic, 0.51% Asian, and 0.05% Native American. 39.5% of the district's students were eligible to receive free lunch.

Previous school years

Accountability statistics

See also
List of school districts in Mississippi

References

External links

Education in Lauderdale County, Mississippi
School districts in Mississippi